Tarah C. Toohil (born October 1, 1979) is an American attorney and politician who served as a member of the Pennsylvania House of Representatives until 2022. She is currently a judge on the Luzerne County Court of Common Pleas.

Early life and education 
Toohil was born on October 1, 1979 in Drums, Pennsylvania and graduated from Hazleton Area High School in 1998. She majored in political science and sociology at Northeastern University, graduating in 2003. Toohil earned a Juris Doctor from Penn State Dickinson Law in 2008.

Career 
In 2010, Toohil was elected to represent the 116th District in the Pennsylvania House of Representatives. She defeated then-House Majority Leader Todd Eachus to gain the seat. During the 2019-2020 legislative session, Toohil served as a member of the House Children and Youth (vice chair), Government Oversight, Human Services, Judiciary, Professional Licensure and Rules committees.

In 2021, legislation Toohil sponsored was enacted that prohibits life and health insurance companies from discriminating against living organ donors in Pennsylvania.

Toohil is a co-founder of "Brandon's Forever Home," a Pennsylvania charity that assists foster children.

Toohil is against legalizing adult-use cannabis in Pennsylvania, citing concerns for a potential negative impact on children.

In 2021, Toohil ran for the Luzerne County Court of Common Pleas. She was successful, and effectively resigned from the House of Representatives on December 31, 2022. She was sworn in as a judge on January 3, 2022.

Personal life 

In 2012, an anonymous person posted videos allegedly of Toohil at a party smoking marijuana as blackmail against her anti-marijuana legalization stance. Pennsylvania State Police launched an investigation into the matter.

Toohil formerly dated Delaware County Republican representative Nicholas Miccarelli III. In 2018, Toohil stated that Miccarelli made threats against her and sexually abused her during and after their relationship. She was granted a restraining order against Miccarelli in 2018. Miccarelli has been accused by other women of sexual harassment leading to the revocation of his security privileges at the state capitol and his retirement from the legislature in 2018.

Electoral history

|-
! style="background-color: #800080; width: 2px;" |
| style="width: 130px" | Democratic/Republican
|               | Stefanie Salavantis
| align="right" | 42,571
| align="right" | 40.79
|-

References

External links
State Representative Tarah Toohil official caucus website
Tarah Toohil (R) official PA House website
Tarah Toohil for State Representative official campaign website

Judges of the Pennsylvania Courts of Common Pleas
Republican Party members of the Pennsylvania House of Representatives
Living people
Women state legislators in Pennsylvania
1979 births
21st-century American politicians
21st-century American women politicians
21st-century American judges
21st-century American women judges